Shallum Pires (born 24 August 1992) is an Indian footballer who currently plays for Churchill Brothers in the I-League and Goa Professional League.

Career

Dempo
Pires made his debut for Dempo in the I-League on 16 April 2011 against Pailan Arrows at the Fatorda Stadium. He scored the first goal of the match in the 5th minute to give Dempo the lead in a match they would go on to win 5–2. He then did not make his second appearance for the club for over a year till 15 December 2012 against Pune F.C. in which Dempo lost 5–1 and Pires came on as a substitute.

Career statistics

Club

References

Indian footballers
1992 births
Living people
People from South Goa district
Footballers from Goa
I-League players
Dempo SC players
India youth international footballers
Association football defenders